Karthika Deepam is an Indian Telugu-language television series which airs on Star Maa. It stars Premi Viswanath, Paritala Nirupam, Shoba Shetty as main leads . The series is a remake of the Malayalam television series Karuthamuthu, which aired on Asianet. Karthika Deepam premiered on 16 October 2017 and ended on 23 January 2023. It starred Amulya Omkar Gowda and Keerthi Bhat with Maanas Nagulapalli and Manoj Kumar as main leads from March to August 2022.

The first season of the series starts with Viswanath, Nirupam and Shetty with Archana Ananth, Sangeeta Kamath and Yashwanth playing the supporting roles.

In 2018, an 8-year leap was introduced. These included Deepa and Karthick's twin daughters; Sourya and Hima played by Baby Krithika and Baby Sahruda as a parallel leads along with Premi, Nirupam and Shoba.

In Mar 2022, another 15-year leap was introduced where several new characters were introduced. It focuses Sourya and Hima as grown up played by Amulya Omkar Gowda and Bhat in addition with Maanas Nagulapalli and Manoj Kumar playing as leads of the second generation.

In Aug 2022, a flashback was introduced where the original main leads Premi Viswanath, Nirupam Paritala and Shoba Shetty re-entered the show along with Archana Ananth, Gadiraju Arun Kumar, Baby Krithika and Baby Sahruda in the supporting roles

Summary

Episodes 1-1305, 1431-1568
Dr. Karthik loves and marries a dark skinned intelligent girl Deepa. Karthik's obsessive one side lover, Dr. Mounitha vows to destroy Karthik and Deepa's relationship and marry Karthik.

Episodes 1305-1431
Sourya accuses Hima of their parent's death and leaves the house. Fifteen years later, Sourya and Hima cross paths.

Plot

Season 1 (Episode 1-347)
Karthik, a doctor, and Deepa frequently meet. Karthik is impressed by Deepa's kindness and generosity. His brother Aditya falls in love with Deepa's stepsister Sravya, who loves Karthik. Aditya's mother, Soundarya, and Sravya's parents agree to the match. Sravya, initially overjoyed (assuming that she will marry Karthik), threatens suicide unless Karthik marries her. Karthik asks permission to marry Deepa, and Sravya's father (with whom she lives) is evasive. Karthik and Deepa marry at a temple and announce their marriage at a party, angering Soundarya and Sravya. Soundarya allows Deepa into the household; Sravya marries Aditya, but initially wants to get rid of Aditya and Deepa.

Karthik's childhood friend Mounitha returns, and wants him. She causes Sravya to miscarry and falsely convinces Karthik that Deepa is having an affair with her friend, the novelist Vihari. Deepa becomes pregnant, and is accepted by Soundarya.

Karthik has a fertility test, and Mounitha (who was responsible for the death of Hima, his college girlfriend) switches the samples. She botches several attempts to have Deepa killed, and hires Durga to kill her; after seeing Deepa's kindness, however, Durga protects her. Mounitha unsuccessfully tries to have them killed in a car accident. Durga reveals his identity to Deepa but, because he is in love with Monitha, he blames Karthik. Deepa prepares to leave the house; Karthik says that he is not the father of Deepa's child, and thinks that Vihari is the father. Deepa leaves; Karthik's father and brother ask him to be retested, but Mounitha convinces him not to do so.

Deepa gets a job at a petrol station. Vihari explains Soundarya his brother-sister relationship with Deepa and proves that he had no affair with her. Soundarya feels guilty for misunderstanding her and asks Deepa to return; she refuses. Deepa unknowingly gives birth to twins, and Soundarya takes one home. Karthik begins to love the child, and names her Hima after his late girlfriend; Deepa leaves the city with her other child, Souurya.

Season 2--8 years later (Episode 347-1305)

Deepa runs a village tailor shop. She and Sourya return to the city for her medical treatment; working as a cook, she crosses paths with Karthik and his family. Deepa misunderstands that Karthik married Mounitha. 
Deepa cooks for the staff and children in Hima's school. Hima befriends Deepa. Hima calls her by the name 'Vantalakka'. Karthik who notices Sourya's concern for her mother and her her strong desire to achieve her dreams sponsors her education. 
Meanwhile, Hima make Karthik feel envious of Vantalakka, though not knowing that she is Deepa. Soundarya learns Vantalakka is none other than Deepa when Hima invites her home. At Hima's birthday Karthik also learn about vantalakka. He feels betrayed by his family. Soundarya also learns that Sourya is none other than her granddaughter. Karthik takes a stern decision to leave with Hima to America after learning about Hima and Deepa's closeness. But his plan failed as Hima falls sick. Karthik learns that Sourya is Deepa's daughter. Deepa learns that she has gave birth to twins and the other twin is Hima. Mounitha continues to provoke Karthik against Deepa. Karthik decides to divorce Deepa. The court orders them to live together for six months and then decide about the divorce. Karthik and Deepa live together for a week and the children live with grandparents. Karthik makes unexpected request and Deepa becomes heartbroken. They start to lead their normal lives again.

Deepa still has hopes that she will reunite with Karthik. Sourya learns that Karthik is her father. She keeps it a secret until she gets questioned by Deepa and Soundarya one day. Hima asks her mother's picture as gift for her birthday. Karthik show his ex-girlfriend Hima's picture and tells Hima that she is her mother. Deepa gets frustrated. She leaves the birthday party alone, making Sourya worried. She seeks Karthik's help to search her. Karthik tries to convince Sourya to go home. Sourya reveals that she knows that he is her father. She promises him she will not tell anyone about it if he helps her find Deepa. Next day morning, he brings Deepa home after finding her. Deepa goes back to her house with Sourya. Karthik fears that Sourya will reveal the truth to Hima. He decides to shift Hima to another school. He collects the TC along with Hima. Hima is feels disheartened to leave the school, her friends, Sourya and Deepa. She hugs Sourya and cries. Karthik back off from his decision and tears the TC. Sourya finds that both Hima and she have been born in the same date. She get confused. She had an illusion that Hima is Karthik's 2nd  wife's daughter and his wife died, but if both of them are born in the same date, how could have Karthik married another woman after separating Deepa. She tries to find the answer for her question. She threatens Deepa and Soundarya to tell the truth or she will leave Hyderabad to somewhere else by herself. Soundarya reveals that Hima is her twin sister to Sourya and they both are Karthik and Deepa's daughters. Hima spots a lady faint out of thirst while going in car. She helps the lady to her home. She spot Hima Sr. photo in the lady's house and asks about it and learns who she really is. Hima feels betrayed by Karthik. She starts hurting Karthik by not speaking to him properly. After a few days, she asks everyone about the truth. Karthik reveals that she was adopted by him.Deepa and Sourya return home after Soundarya's advice. Karthik promises Hima he will find her parents. Hima spots Karthik and Deepa's marriage photo in an old newspaper article. She questions them. Karthik gets furious at Deepa and Soundarya for revealing the truth to Hima even though it was not their fault. Karthik leaves the house in search of Hima's parents. Mounitha on the hand instigates Hima to question Deepa and Soundarya via their conversation. Sourya reveals the truth about their parent to Hima when she questions Deepa and Soundarya. Karthik returns home failed to find her parents. Karthik is confused about the sudden change in Hima's behaviour and Deepa' decision to go back to her house. To find the truth, he leaves Hima at Deepa's place. Karthik learns that Hima is Deepa's daughter, after her overhearing their conversation. He feels betrayed by everyone and questions everyone about their betrayal. He decides to leave the house. Deepa stops him and leaves with Hima and Sourya. Karthik is elected by the doctor's council to be their president and is requested by them to come to the ceremony. At the ceremony, Hima reveals everything about her family. Karthik unable to answer the question of the press tries to leaves. Mounitha humiliates Deepa at Karthik's award ceremony in front of the press. Deepa get angry and pledges to prove her innocence.Deepa learns that Mounitha was behind the death of Karthik's girlfriend. Deepa learns about Vihari's infertility and unsuccessfully tries to prove her inncocence to Karthik. She leaves again; Soundarya and Murali Krishna look for her, and Karthik promises to marry Mounitha if she finds Hima. Deepa runs a successful tiffin centre, but again becomes ill; Karthik decides to retake the fertility test.

He finds Deepa, Sourya and Hima, and brings them back to the city (Deepa for the sake of the children). Karthik learns that Deepa is seriously ill, and has her treated. He invites Mounitha to a family gathering, and she poisons Deepa's medicines. Karthik tells Deepa about her illness, and she fears for her children's future if she dies; Soundarya comforts her.

Karthik learns about Vihari's infertility and that Deepa never had an affair with Vihari. Guilty about accusing Deepa, he decides to apologize at a puja held for her. Mounitha accuses Karthik of impregnating her, and Deepa moves into a rented house. Karthik and the girls join her, and he tries to reconcile with her. Deepa begins to suspect Mounitha (who tries to force Karthik to marry her), and Karthik tries to find out if he is the father of her child.

Mounitha approaches ACP Roshini, and accuses Karthik of impregnating and deceiving her. Roshini investigates and Deepa finds Anji, a former contact killer who killed Karthik's girlfriend. Mounitha kidnaps Anji after confessing her crimes; Deepa records her confession, and plays it for Karthik.

Karthik confronts Mounitha, who says that she impregnated herself with his sperm sample. Deepa's stepmother Bhagyam, who is held captive in Mounitha's room for threatening her to leave Karthik and Deepa alone hears a gunshot from the hall, and thinks that Mounitha is dead. Roshini arrests Karthik for killing Mounitha and hiding her body. A disguised Mounitha tries to kill Deepa, who recognizes her. She escapes, and Deepa's family does not believe her. Mounitha bribes a constable to meet Karthik in disguise, but he suspects that she is Mounitha. She gives him pills which makes him ill, and he is hospitalized. Disguised as a doctor, threatens to kill Karthik's family unless he marries her. Deepa takes Mounitha to court, and she is sentenced to 18 months' imprisonment. Karthik is acquitted, and Mounitha (faking a heart attack in prison) goes to Karthik's hospital. Hima misunderstands an overheard conversation, and begins to suspect Karthik. Mounitha's maid, Priyamani, gets a job at Karthik's house to pass information to her. However, Priyamani is soon exposed to Deepa, who ousts her and scolds herself for trusting her. Mounitha is freed from prison under excuses of maternity problems and starts to torment Karthik's family. Hima and Sourya reconcile with Karthik but Mounitha tries to manipulate Deepa into believing that her newborn child is Karthik's son through natural means. Surprisingly, Deepa supports Karthik after Mounitha's child is named after Karthik's father Ananda Rao. She is exposed during the naming ceremony and the family finally reunites but Mounitha spoils Karthik's surgery resulting in the patient's death. Karthik names all of his properties, which he earned, not inherited to the victim's wife and daughters and decides to leave to a village with his wife and children.

Without informing Saundarya and family, Deepa and Karthik leave the city with their children to Thatikonda, a remote village feared by merciless money lender Rudrani, who torments the family of Kotesh and Srivalli. Deepa and Karthik shelter Kotesh and Srivalli, who suffers from a miscarriage, but Kotesh abducts Mounitha's son Anand and brings him as an orphaned boy for adoption. After Rudrani has Kotesh and Srivalli killed, Deepa and Karthik adopt Anand unaware that he is Mounitha's son. Sourya suffers from a heart disease, but Karthik saves her by operating on her without licence as the hospital doctors knew him as a famous cardio. Hima is kidnapped by Rudrani but Saundarya comes to her rescue and the family reunites. Mounitha accepts to retrieve Karthik's license if he operates on her uncle and Karthik accepts. Mounitha learns that Anand is being raised by Karthik and Deepa. She conceals it from the family and challenges Karthik that she will leave him if he finds her missing son. Karthik accepts unaware of her conspiracy while Saundarya and Deepa learn that Kotesh and Srivalli had adopted Mounitha's son. Saundarya make Mounitha to reveal Anand as her son by performing adoption ceremony and gives back Anand to Mounitha and warns her to stay away from her family. Hima initially hates their idea as she had grown too close with Anand but comes to terms with it.

Karthik, Deepa, Hima and Sourya go on a trip to Chikmagalur where they enjoy themselves while Hima is fascinated to driving car. On a hill, Hima stubbornly starts to drive and Deepa boards the car unwillingly in Karthik and Sourya's absence. After the car loses balance, Hima starts to panic and Karthik boards the car to save his daughter and wife. Though the danger comes to a halt, his car unfortunately hits a rock and falls off the cliff killing Karthik, Deepa and Hima while Sourya, the sole survivor loses consciousness. Karthik and Deepa's near and dear mourn their demise while Mounitha considers herself widowed and leaves handing over the responsibility of her properties and Anand to Aruna and Lakshman members of chawl, where she began to live by setting a hospital on Karthik's name. While Sourya remains unconscious, due to Karthik's demise, Karthik's estranged elder sister Swapna reconciles with her family except for Saundarya after mourning his and Deepa's deaths. She is revealed to be separated from her husband Satyam. Meanwhile, Hima, alive returns to see her family but upon hearing Sourya blaming her for Karthik and Deepa's deaths and expressing her hatred towards her, she leaves home leaving the family unaware of her existence. At Swapna's house, Saundarya tries to settle the dispute between Swapna and her husband Satyam, who are separated and their two sons live with each of them. However, Saundarya attempts are foiled due to Swapna's unwillingness and insecurities about reuniting with her husband. While Saundarya is travelling with Prem and Nirupam (Swapna and Satyam's twins), the former spots Hima and she is brought home.

Sourya refuses to accept and forgive Hima but rather insults her. Next morning, Saundarya finds Sourya to be missing who leaves the home out of disgust towards Hima, who is heartbroken.

Season 3--15 years later (Episode 1305-1431)

Hima is a generous, soft-hearted and innocent doctor while Sourya is a benevolent, daring and outspoken autorickshaw driver going by the name of "Jwala", who is raised by former small-time thieves Indrudu and Chandramma. Sourya and her foster parents arrive at Hyderabad where Indrudu and Chandramma work as cooks for Prem, a professional photographer who lives with Satyam but Swapna wants him to live with her and Nirupam, a doctor. Aditya and Shravya have not returned from America since Karthik and Deepa's deaths. Sourya befriends Nirupam, Prem and Hima but is unaware that she is her sister. Sourya clashes with Swapna but does not know that she is her aunt as she had not seen her as she is estranged to the family since Sourya and Hima were not born and she had not seen Swapna when she visited their home as Sourya was lying unconscious due to shock of her parents' death. Hima learns the truth about Jwala being Sourya and tries to make sure that she does not learn the truth. She thwarts Sourya's attempts in learning about her grown-up sister Hima. Meanwhile, Hima and Sourya simultaneously but separately discover that Anand is their half-brother. Anand, whose foster parents are killed for his property lives as a poor being with Aruna's elder sister who treats him miserably.

Anand is Sourya's friend and as he is unaware of his actual name, he goes by other name. However, Sourya and Hima address him as Rava Idli as he is running a tiffin centre that finances his medical studies. Hima and Sourya learn that Rava Idli is Anand but hide it to themselves. Swapna criticizes Hima and Soundarya and insults the latter's secret desire in getting Hima and Nirupam married but does not know that both Nirupam and Prem love Hima. Swapna hates Sourya (Jwala) for being close to Nirupam and Prem and burns her autorickshaw for bringing Satyam to Prem's photography exhibition. So, Nirupam and Hima buy a new auto for Sourya. Swapna wants her friend's daughter to marry Nirupam but Soundarya made the bride tie Rakhi to him. Nirupam, Sourya, Hima and Prem plot and compel Swapna into having a twenty fifth anniversary arranged for her and Satyam. In the party, Soundarya unexpectedly announces that Nirupam and Hima would marry that upsets Prem while Swapna vows to break the marriage. Sourya loves Nirupam and is unaware of the engagement as she could not attend the party. On the engagement day, Swapna steals the engagement rings but Soundarya saves the day. However, Soundarya and Nirupam's excitement goes for a toss when Hima refuses to be engaged as she knows that sourya also loves Nirupam.

Swapna invites another doctor Shoba to marry Nirupam but Shoba conspires to marry Nirupam so that she could pay the loan with the help of Nirupam, she took for building her hospital. While Nirupam is desperate to know why Hima rejected him, he starts to be close for making Hima jealous but she becomes happy. Saundarya asks Sourya to search for grown-up Sourya misunderstanding her to be Jwala. Shoba employs her maid to befriend Indrudu and Chandramma for learning about Sourya and humiliating her as Sourya once had slapped her and also is jealous of her closeness with Nirupam. Shoba learns that Indrudu and Chandramma were thieves.Prem's plans to propose Hima fail. In the party, Shoba and Swapna accuse Indrudu and Chandramma of theft but Hima proves their innocence. To have Nirupam married to Sourya, Hima lies to everyone that she has Cancer and wishes to see Nirupam married. She plans to place a condition to Nirupam that he should marry Jwala (Sourya). Shoba learns that Jwala is none other than Sourya, Hima's sister and phones Sourya as Hima antagonizing the latter in Sourya's mind. Hima asks Sourya to propose Nirupam but it fails due to Shoba, whose truth is discovered by Hima. Soundarya learns that Hima never had cancer.

Vexed up, Hima divulges to Soundarya and Ananda Rao that Jwala is Sourya. Jwala learns that her friend whom she has been close to is Hima and believes that she is taking Nirupam away from her and marrying him by gaining sympathy telling that she has cancer. Later at an award function jwala finds the Hima. Found that tingari (Hima) is none other than her sister and becomes very angry and disheartened.

Sourya misunderstand Hima's intentions. Meanwhile, Shoba gains Swapna's trust and affection. Soundarya and Anand Rao plead with Sourya to return home. 
After accepting few conditions Sourya return home to live with her sister and grandparents. Hima tries to mend her relationship with her sister. She explains the situation to Prem. Prem and Hima hatch a plan to unite Nirupam and Sourya.

Swapna reveals to Nirupam that Jwala is non other than Sourya and Hima is trying to unite him with her sister. 
Nirupam stays strong in his decision about marrying Hima.

Soundarya slaps Hima and warns her to stop everything since her marriage with Nirupam is fixed. She also warns Shoba not to interfere in their family issues. Soundarya prepares for and engagement ceremony for Hima and Nirupam. Nirupam seeks Sourya's to help him marry her sister. Whereas Swapna also prepare for an engagement ceremony for Shoba and Nirupam. Sourya exposes Shoba's deeds.

Swapna realizes her mistakes and seek forgiveness for her attitude towards her family members. She accepts Hima and Sourya and continue the preparations for engagement ceremony.

On the day of the engagement, Anand Rao reveals that he was the one who sent Varanasi to help her in hard times. Sourya gets slapped by Soundarya for questioning Anand Rao. 
Everybody leaves for the temple for the engagement.

At the temple,Varanasi reveals that KARTHIK AND DEEPA ARE ALIVE!!!

Season 4--15 years back (aftermath of the accident) (Episodes 1431-1568)

Deepa regains consciousness. Dr. Hemachandra, the one who saved her accommodates her in his house. She also learns that Soundarya, Anand Rao, Hima and Sourya had sold the house in hyderabad and left for America. She continues her search for Karthik.

Sourya who leaves the house because of Hima is adopted by a couple and is renamed as Jwala. She still believes that Karthik and Deepa are alive and searches for them with help of Varanasi.

Deepa gets an information that Karthik is admitted in hospital nearby and enquires about him in that hospital. To her surprise, someone had already taken Karthik with them stating she is his wife. Deepa doubts Mounitha. Later Deepa spots Karthik in a market, but Karthik does not recognise her. She faints. She continues her search for Karthik in a park where she spots Mounitha. Mounitha tricks Deepa into believing that she knows nothing about Karthik and is searching for him

Mounitha is then seen living with Karthik who does not remember his past because of the accident. She now runs a Boutique. After the accident, Mounitha makes Karthik believe that she is his wife. Mounitha gives him pills to erase his past completely from his mind.

Deepa who spots Karthik again goes in search of him and discovers Mounitha's evil plan. She challenges her that she will win Karthik back just as she did before.

She rents a house opposite to Mounitha's Boutique. She again becomes Vantalakka and cooks for Karthik and Mounitha. Mounitha who fears Karthik and Deepa's closeness tries to separate them. She stages a drama stating Deepa poisoned her making Karthik furious. But after Deepa promises in front of God at the temple Karthik believes Deepa.

Meanwhile, Soundarya, Anand Rao, Hima learn about Sourya's whereabouts and pleads with her to return home. She resolves that she will return only when her parents do.

Mounitha continues to plot against Deepa and provokes Karthik against her.

In the meantime, she leaves to Hyderabad to bring her son home so that Karthik will get closer to her and believe her. Karthik who notices Mounitha's fear for Deepa starts doubting her. To make sure that Karthik believes her, she pays people to say that she is Karthik's wife and make him believe that to.
Everything goes on as per her plan and Karthik lashes out at Deepa for lying even when she was telling the truth.

Soundarya doubts Mounitha when she took Anand with her from Saroja. She gets caught when she yells Karthik while talking over the phone. Soundarya and Anand Rao come to her place in search of Karthik. But Mounitha tricks them by hiding Karthik and Deepa.

The members of their neighbourhood plan for colony festival where Deepa is requested to cook for them.In the colony meeting she tells about her story and ask permission to execute a skit. Everybody claps and suggests her to play the main role in the skit. Deepa invites Karthik to the skit and promises him that she will show her husband if he comes. Karthik agrees. Karthik shouts 'Deepa!!!' after watching the skit but loses consciousness. Deepa admits him in the hospital and hopes that he remembers the past. Unfortunately, Karthik does not remember anything. He leaves home with Mounitha. Doctors advise Deepa to not make him remember the past forcefully, as it might lead to his death

On the way home, Mounitha spots Durga. Durga follows her. He finds Deepa and learns about the tragedy. He starts planning a scheme to make Karthik doubt Mounitha's character. He promises Deepa that he will make sure Monitha spills the truth before Karthik and unite her and Karthik.

Karthik starts doubting Mounitha's character due to durga's attitude towards her. Durga and Deepa rejoice has their revenge plan works as planned.

Karthik starts doubting if Mounitha is his wife since whatever she says does not match with the memories of past he tries to remember. Mounitha gets caught when Deepa wishes Karthik 'Happy birthday' and she forgets to.

Mounitha takes Karthik to the village where she set up people to make Karthik believe she is his wife. Deepa,Hemachandra and his mother reach the same place and explains rajalakshmi (the village head and the doctor's aunt) her story. Rajalakshmi promises to help Deepa. Durga continues to provoke Karthik's suspicion on Mounitha. The village women along with Deepa and monitha celebrate bathukkama festival.

Rajalakshmi reveals that she has never seen Monitha in the village and she does not belong here in front of everyone. At the same time Mounitha spots Sourya, she makes sure Karthik and Deepa do not spot. Mounitha and Deepa have an heated argument. Karthik overhears everything and confronts Mounitha. She threatens Karthik that she will kill Deepa if she comes between them. Karthik is confused and is unable to find the truth.

Rajalakshmi spots a confused Karthik and advise him to believe Deepa and not Mounitha. Varanasi spots Karthik and gets shocked to see him alive. Karthik gets angry when he confronts him. Varanasi shows some photos of him and Deepa. Karthik tries to believe Varanasi but is confused, he asks Varanasi to leave him alone.

Mounitha on the other hand sets up some henchmen to kill Deepa. Varanasi spots them trying to kill her and saves her by beating them. Karthik spot Varanasi being captured by them. He saves him. Varanasi falls down unconsciously

At the same time, Sourya who is furious at Mounitha for lying about her parents tries to hit her with a rock. Mounitha spots her move and escapes, but the rock hits Karthik's head.

Karthik recollects the past. He shouts for his wife and children. He tries to wake up Varanasi and know their whereabouts. Karthik admits Varanasi in a nearby hospital. Doctors inform him the Varanasi is in  a very critical stage and there are chances of him going to coma.

After regaining his memory, Karthik has many doubts. All that he knows is Mounitha is responsible for everything. He is determined to seek vengeance from her.

Deepa and Mounitha are worried as Karthik goes missing. Deepa accuses Mounitha of hiding Karthik and lying to her once again. Durga,Hemachandra and his mother pacify her and they believe that Karthik went missing in the market. Deepa cries for Karthik. Deepa and Durga leave to search for Karthik. At the same time, Karthik unknowingly bumps on her.

Karthik does not reveal that he regained his memory to Deepa for her safety. He starts acting he does not remember anything. Karthik plans to reveal the truth only when he seek his vengeance from Mounitha. Deepa accompanies Karthik to Mounitha's house. Mounitha starts blaming Deepa for Karthik going missing. Karthik lashes out at Mounitha for accusing Deepa. Durga continues to trouble Mounitha in front of Karthik.

After a while, Durga confronts Mounitha about her attempt to kill Deepa. Mounitha asks Durga to get out. Deepa and Karthik overhear their conversation. Karthik lashes out at Mounitha for attempting an attack on Deepa.

Karthik ask Shiva to search for Sourya. Shiva tells Karthik that Mounitha always gets tense when she sees Sourya and even warned him to stay away from her. Karthik gets angry on Mounitha for hiding his daughter from him. Karthik searches for Sourya. He feels sorry for Deepa for not being able to be a good husband for her and decides protect her from Mounitha now on. The next day morning, Mounitha lashes out at Deepa for accommodating Karthik in her house. Deepa slaps Mounitha and tells her what happened. Mounitha questions Karthik's silence after Deepa slapped her. Karthik supports Deepa and leaves. Durga continues to trouble Mounitha by bringing breakfast for her. Deepa brings breakfast for Karthik and requests him to eat it. Karthik agrees and eats the breakfast she brought. He feels relieved that he regained his memory after observing Mounitha's behaviour. Varanasi's doctor calls Karthik and updates him on Varanasi's health.

Deepa tells Hemachandra how she and Karthik do not like when the house is not tidy. Hemachandra asks her to come back to his house. Karthik arrives and asks Hemachandra to not worry about Deepa. Hemachandra leaves and asks Karthik to take care of Deepa. Karthik helps Deepa to clean the house. He also cooks lunch for her. Durga continues to trigger Mounitha's jealousy by telling her about Karthikand Deepa's closeness. Just when Karthik and Deepa are about to have lunch, Mounitha arrives. Karthik acts as if he suspects Mounitha and Durga's relationship. Mounitha leaves after hearing Karthik's suspicions on her. Karthik takes a vow to make Mounitha know her place and make sure she does not disturb his and Deepa's  time together. Mounitha gives Karthik pills and says that it is for his health to get better. Karthik realises that the pills are for making him forget the past and throws them away. He makes Mounitha believe he ate them. Mounitha challenges Durga that she will make him and Deepa leave her and Karthik. Durga tells Deepa about Mounitha's threat. Deepa tells Karthik about the same. Mounitha arrives with the police and asks them to arrest Durga. Karthik confronts the police about his arrest. They show him a video clip that Mounitha shooted regarding Durga's confession with his friend over the phone. Karthik saves Durga by stating Mounitha is his relative, so she is also an accused. Just when the police where about to arrest them both, Karthik informs that both are innocent. He states that Mounitha is a memory loss patient and does not know what she speaks. When they confront him about the video clip, Durga cooks up a story. The police get disappointed at Mounitha and leave. Durga and Deepa leave. Mounitha confront Karthik about his behaviour, Karthik covers up by stating he saved Durga for her. Karthik continues his search for Sourya. This time he hears her voice from a distance but his attempt to catch her fails. He feels given up and decided to kick Mounitha out as soon as possible and tell Deepa the truth. Durga pays respect to Karthik's photo and triggers Mounitha's anger.He tries to make Mounitha believe that Karthik is trying to let go of her and live with Deepa. Karthik hears the baby's cry just as he arrive home. He scolds Mounitha for not taking care of the baby. He shouts for Durga. Mounitha tells him that Durga is not here.He continues to anger Mounitha by continuing his act to lay suspicions on her and Durga. Mounitha gets fed up with Durga and asks begs him to leave. Durga tells Mounitha that he will not pity her for her tears. Deepa feels disappointed for not being able to speak with the person who sheltered Sourya she doubts if the girl he is talking about is Sourya. She starts searching for Sourya. Karthik spots Deepa and learns that she is searching for Sourya. Deepa explains Karthik about Sourya's desire for popcorn when he see him holding popcorn. Karthik speaks in his mind that he bought popcorn for Sourya. Just at that moment, Deepa spots Sourya in an auto. Deepa and Karthik chase the auto. Unfortunately, they missed the auto. Mounitha hires Vani to get rid of Deepa and Durga. Mounitha lashes out at Deepa for taking Karthik along with her. Suddenly Vani slaps Mounitha and cooks up a story to gain Deepa and Durga's trust. She tries to make Durga fall for her. The next day morning, she mixes poison in the breakfast Deepa prepared for her and Durga. Just as they were about to it, Karthik arrives, Deepa unknowingly gives the poisoned food to Karthik. Mounitha panics and throws the plate out of Karthik's hand. She threatens him to not come to eat at Deepa's house. Karthik decides to oust Mounitha and tell Deepa the truth as soon as  possible. Deepa decides to get back her husband from Mounitha. As s part of his plan, Karthik questions Mounitha about Priyamani. He cooks up a story that he spotted her. Mounitha shows a photo of them being together to make him believe that she is his wife. Karthik shows another of him and Deepa being together and asks if Deepa is his wife. Since she is unable to answer his questions, Karthik warns Mounitha to not give warnings or speak badly about him and Deepa. Later that day, Deepa spots Indrudu and enquires him about Sourya. Karthik also arrives there. After knowing their pet names, Indrudu suspects that they are Sourya's parents. Deepa asks a photo of Sourya to confirm it is her. Indrudu scared of giving back Sourya to them, lies that he does not have the photo and asks them to come tomorrow to see her. Afterwards, Indrudu feels guilty for not showing them the photo. Mounitha tells Vani her  real story. Vani plans to kill Deepa by setting her house in fire. Durga catches Vani trying to kill Deepa. He also learns of Mounitha's plan. Next day morning, Mounitha feels disappointed to see Deepa alive. Durga threatens Mounitha about telling Karthik about her evil plan. Karthik arrives and again starts to lash out Mounitha for behaving undecently. Karthik and Deepa get ready to see Sourya. Frustrated, Mounitha breaks everything in the house and behaves like a lunatic. She plans to kill Deepa herself this time. On the other hand, Karthik and Deepa follow Indrudu to his house. Deepa has a strong  feeling that the girl they are about to see is Sourya. Indrudu introduces Chandramma to Karthik and Deepa. Chandramma hides Sourya. She shows another girl and tells Deepa and Karthik she is the girl they came for. Karthik and Deepa get disappointed. Deepa gets heart broken and feels sad about her ill-fate.Chandramma expresses her decision to keep Sourya with them when Indrudu questions her. Karthik goes there again doubting Indrudu. Indrudu hides Sourya fromKarthik. Deepa doubts Indrudu's behaviour. Deepa question Durga about Vani. He reveal Mounitha's plan to kill her with the help of Vani. Deepa slaps Mounitha and warns her to mend her ways. The next day, Deepa goes to Indrudu's house and enquires about Sourya. Chandramma hides Sourya and lies to Deepa to make her leave. Mounitha's car breaks down. She tries to call Karthik but he does not pick up the call. She spots Indrudu's Auto and gets a ride a back home. On the way, she spots Karthik and asks Indrudu to drop her there. Karthik spots Indrudu and tries catch him but fails. After seeing Mounitha getting down from Indrudu's Auto, he suspects Mounitha of hiding Sourya with help of Indrudu. He drops her back at ther place where her car broke down. Even after questioning Mounitha, he suspects Mounitha of hiding Sourya. Durga after seeing Deepa's plight for her daughter plans to go to Indrudu's house to bring Sourya back. Karthik afraid that Mounitha will do something to Sourya, stops Durga. Mounitha questions Deepa if she knows any auto driver nearby. Deepa slaps her and ask her to get out. Anand Rao and Hima reach Sourya's place and compel her to come back home. Anand Rao scolds Indrudu for supporting Sourya's decision and blames him for Sourya's attitude. He takes a strong decision to leave home with Sourya. The next day Indrudu slaps Chandramma for sending Sourya with Anand Rao. Mounitha questions Karthik about his behaviour. Karthik tells Mounitha that her behaviour is the reason for his attitude towards her and leaves. Karthik's suspicion on Mounitha becomes strong when she learns about Mounitha's enquiry from Deepa. Deepa and Karthik search for Sourya. Karthik and Deepa spot Sourya in a car and run after it. At the same time, Indrudu chases the car. Anand Rao forcefully takes Sourya home with him in that car. Unable to catch up, Karthik and Deepa miss the car. Indrudu chases and stops the car. Sourya leaves with Indrudu despite Anand Rao's order. Karthik and Deepa goes to see Indrudu again in his house, but the house seems to be locked. Though Karthik plans to wait for them, Deepa convinces him to come here tomorrow. On the other hand, Durga makes Mounitha tensed by telling her that Karthik got his memory back and he and Deepa escaped from her. Mounitha panicked about Durga's words, waits for Karthik to return home. Karthik returns home and rebukes Mounitha. The next day, Karthik and Deepa head for Indrudu's house. All their efforts are in vain, as Indrudu left the house with Sourya the day before night. Just as they look around the house, they find a picture of Sourya with indrudu and chandramma. Deepa cries for Sourya and feels heart broken for not being able to get her daughter back. She rings the temple bell continuously to everyone's amaze. Karthik consoles Deepa and takes her home. Mounitha barges into Deepa's house. Durga arrive and instigates her fear again. Mounitha suspects that Karthik has got his memory back. Just then Deepa and Karthik arrive they spot Mounitha and Durga together. Karthik talks ill about Mounitha and Durga's relationship frustrating Mounitha. On the other hand, Mounitha accuses Karthik of his closeness with Deepa. A grief-stricken Deepa asks Karthik to take Mounitha away from there as she is tired of her arguments. Karthik asks Deepa to be strong and leaves with Mounitha. Mounitha suspects Karthik and tries searching his room for any evidence to prove her suspicion. She finds 500Rs.notes in his wallet. She questions Karthik how he got this money. Usually she was the one who used to give him money for expenditure and he used to take care of the boutique. Nowadays, Karthik does not ask her money and treats her as a stranger. She questions Karthik about his behaviour. Karthik cleverly escapes from Mounitha by telling excuses and not letting her that he got his memory back. Just then Durga arrives and continues to trouble Mounitha. Karthik who finds Durga as an escape from Mounitha, continues to pin-point him for his behaviour. The next day, Mounitha finds Deepa cleaning the temple. She asks a priest why is she cleaning the temple. He tells that people who are desperate about their wish to God take a solemn vow and fulfill them in a hope that it will happen. When she asks him what she wished for, he says that it is not right to know about others wishes to God. Karthik finds Deepa's house locked. He waits for her. Just then he hears Anand crying.When he goes inside, he finds Mounitha missing. Just then Mounitha arrives with all the necessities required for the puja held in the house for Karthika deepam festival. He asks her if she saw Deepa and she explains her situation to him. Karthik upset on hearing about it leaves to see Deepa. Deepa nods when confronted about it. Moreover, she asks Karthik 6000 Rs. for a puja in a troubled manner. Karthik feels shattered after learning about Deepa's situation. Karthik tells her she can  ask him money whenever she want without any shameful. Just then Mounitha grabs the money from Karthik. She lashes out at him for giving Deepa money. Mounitha executes a drama to clear her suspicion. Just as she expected, Karthik slaps her. She gets frustrated on learning about Karthik's drama. Karthik continues to tell some excuses but Mounitha does not believe them and leaves after handing over the money to Deepa. Though her suspicion became strong she does not understand why Karthik said that he and she are husband and wife. Just then, Anand Rao and Hima visit Mounitha's house. Mounitha gets shocked to see him and lashes out at him for disturbing her. Hima asks Mounitha if she can take Anand along with her. To make sure they both leave without Karthik, Deepa or Durga noticing them she agrees to Hima's request. Mounitha spots Karthik about to enter the house. She stops him and tells that Shiva went through an accident and tries to make him leave. Shiva arrives and Karthik gets shocked. Karthik understands that Mounitha is hiding someone in the house. Understanding Mounitha's tension, Shivalatha sends off Anand Rao and Hima via the back door. When Karthik enters, he sees nobody there. But Karthik still suspects Mounitha. Anand Rao asks Hima to focus on her studies and not worry about Sourya.He promises her that he and Soundarya will bring Sourya back. Mounitha heaves a sigh of relief and decides to make a plan to escape with Karthik from Deepa and Durga. 
Deepa and Karthik celebrate karthika deepam. Mounitha warns Deepa that she will kill either her or Karthik if she Karthik leaves her. Mounitha attempts to kill Deepa but Karthik saves her. Karthik questions Mounitha's actions.A frustrated Mounitha orders Karthik to promise that he will not see or talk with Deepa again. Deepa dares Mounitha to burn her. Mounitha leaves out of frustration. Mounitha starts to suspect Karthik's concern over Deepa. Karthik overhears Deepa conversation with Durga about her Mounitha's attempt to kill her. Karthik lashes out Mounitha for her cruel actions. Mounitha reverts by questioning his concern for Deepa. Mounitha warns Deepa to leave Karthik Or else she will kill either one of them. Deepa gives a fitting reply to Mounitha. After a while, Soundarya spots Mounitha in a Restaurant and questions her. Mounitha  escapes from her but Soundarya follows Mounitha to her place. Mounitha notices it and tries to divert her. In the meantime, Deepa tells Karthik that she will make Mounitha to reveal the truth today. Both Karthik and Deepa wait for Mounitha in her house. Mounitha spots them and lock them inside so that Soundarya does not see them. Soundarya tries to break open the lock but Mounitha hit her with a rod. She cleverly lifts an unconscious Soundarya and clears her from there with the help of Shiva. Karthik and Deepa open the door and sees drops of blood on the floor. Mounitha covers up but they both understand that she hit someone who spotted them. Just when Deepa argued with her. Karthik stops the argument and asks Deepa to leaves. Deepa leaves and Mounitha goes inside. An unconscious Soundarya wakes up and finds herself in the hospital. She vows to find the truth from Mounitha. Deepa plans to go on a search for Sourya but her health condition gets worse. Karthik notices Deepa's condition and fears that it might be a fatal disease. Despite Karthik's disapproval, Deepa leaves to search for Sourya in Sangharati. Karthik acts in front of Mounitha to learns her next moves. Karthik reveals the truth about him regaining his memory to Durga. Deepa reaches Sangharati and finds Karthik's photo hung with a garland on it. She question the house owner and learns that she is none other than the wife of the patient who died Karthik's operation. She felt remorse for speaking bad words about Karthik and told that she is in a good position because of Karthik. She helps Deepa in her search for Sourya. Deepa spots a poster which Sourya had posted all over town in search of her parents. She tries contact the number in the poster but Indrudu misleads her by giving a wrong number in the poster. Mounitha gets Durga arrested for his past criminal deeds. Karthik leaves to Deepa's place. Karthik and Deepa search for Sourya. Anand Rao gets a dream  of Mounitha shooting Deepa with a revolver  after the family reunites. Karthik bring Deepa to the hospital and gets her tested. Doctor tell hik that her condition is worse. Karthik tries stops Deepa from cooking but she does not pay heed to him. Karthik starts revealing the truth to Deepa so that she does not go to kitchen. Deepa falls unconscious before hearing Karthik. He takes her to the hospital. He tries to get her ready for an operation. Dr. Charuseela assists Karthik in Deepa's operation. Later she unknowingly reveals to Deepa that Karthik did the surgery Deepa vets to know that Karthik. Deepa feels happy that Karthik remembers the past. On the other hand, Soundarya gets Mounitha arrested for her past deeds with the help of Roshini in fear that she might be giving trouble to Karthik and Deepa. Karthik leaves to Mounitha's to tell her that he remembers the past but to his amaze he learns about Mounitha's arrest. He takes some of his clothes and goes back to Deepa. Charuseela learns about Karthik and Deepa's Story from Deepa. Charuseela gets shocked seeing Deepa checkup results and learns that she has still not cured. She hides it from Karthik. The next day Karthik and Deepa leave for home in Charuseela's car. Just as Karthik and Deepa arrive at the house Deepa faints. Karthik brings Deepa to a hospital and gets to know about Deepa check up results. Karthik burst out into tears and fears about Deepa. Karthik hides Deepa the truth. He brings her back home telling excuses that Soundarya and kids are not in Hyderabad. He spots Indrudu trying to approach Soundarya to return Sourya to her. Karthik stops him and asks him to keep Sourya with himself and do as he says. Indrudu agrees and leaves. The next day Karthik worries about Deepa as she prays for God. He asks her to stop cooking from now on. He tells her that Charuseela will send a maid to help her. Deepa reluctantly agrees to Karthik. Pandari the new maid give a surprise entry in the morning and amazes Deepa by her caring nature. It is later revealed that Pandari is Anji's Mother. Karthik tries to hide Deepa from their family and makes sure that no one notices them. Sourya and Soundarya's attempt to find them ends in failure. It is also revealed that Charuseela is Mounitha friend and faked Deepa's reports to seek revenge. She trick Pandari into giving dangerous pills to Deepa. Deepa's health deteriorates. One day Deepa finds about Karthik's action and confronts him. He lies to her that he is going to die in a few days. Deepa gets shocked but suspicious. Deepa pleads with Karthik to show her Sourya at least once. Karthik agrees and allows Deepa to see Sourya from a distance. The next day Deepa faint and gets admitted. She overhears Karthik and Charuseela's conversation about her health. Charuseela plans to marry Karthik to obtain his assets after Deepa's death. Deepa and Karthik spot Soundarya in Hemachandra's house. Deepa asks Karthik to leave her and go to Soundarya but Karthik does not pay heed to Deepa. Deepa tells him that she know the truth. Karthik get shocked. One morning, Mounitha arrives at the door to Karthik and Deepa's amaze. Deepa pushes her out of the house as she mocks Deepa about her ill health. Mounitha troubles Deepa to make Karthik marry her after she dies. Deepa gets frustrated about Mounitha. She worries about the future if Mounitha continues to remain a problem for them. Deepa and Karthik get to know about Charuseela helping Mounitha. Karthik lashes out Charuseela and warns Mounitha. Mounitha plans to use this opportunity to marry Karthik. Whereas Charuseela is distressed about Mounitha's return. Fearing the future of her family Deepa meets Soundarya and tries to tell truth. On the other hand, the kids find Karthick. All of them are amazed to see Mounitha in their house. Soundarya and Deepa lashes out Mounitha and drags her out. Soundarya take Deepa and Karthik to the house and they celebrate sankranthi. Mounitha give an unexpected offer that she will give her heart to Deepa. Karthik distrust Mounita leaves. Deepa prays to God to leave her alive as she needs to protect her family from Mounitha. Mounitha tells Hima about Deepa's health and Karthik does not want to save Deepa. Unaware of Mounitha's plan hima fall in her trap. Mounitha threatens the family with Hima as hostage. In an attempt to save Hima, Deepa shoots and murders Mounitha.A wounded Mounitha regains consciousness and with a will to separate Deepa and Karthik places a bomb in their car and dies. Deepa struggles to survive and catch breath, she asks Karthik to fulfill her last wish. Just then they got out of the car and fulfill her wish of walking together. Suddenly the bomb blasts and the car explodes.
Karthik tells Deepa that nothing can separate and stop us from living together and motivate her to live. Karthik and Deepa recall their memories. The final episodes ends with Karthik saying we will come back after everything sets in and help Deepa to walk in search of a new ray of hope.

Cast

Leads
 Premi Viswanath as Deepa "Vantalakka" Muralikrishna Karthik: A Cook; Muralikrishna's daughter; Bhagyam's step-daughter; Shravya's half-sister; Karthik's wife; Sourya and Jr. Hima's mother. (2017–2023) 
 Nirupam Paritala as Dr. Karthik Anandrao aka Doctor Babu: A Cardiologist; Soundarya and Anandrao's elder son; Swapna and Aditya's brother; Deepa's husband; Mounitha's love interest; Sourya, Jr. Hima and Anand's father. (2017–2023)  
Shoba Shetty as Dr. Monitha: A Gynaecologist; Karthik's obsessive one-sided lover; Anand's surrogate mother; Deepa's arch-rival (2017-2023) (Dead)

Supporting Leads
Sahruda as Jr. Hima Karthik: Karthik and Deepa's younger daughter; Sourya's twin sister (2018–2023)
 Keerthi Bhat as Adult Jr. Hima Karthik (2022) 
 Krithika as Sourya "Jwala" Karthik: Karthik and Deepa's elder daughter; Indrudu and Chandramma's adoptive daughter; Jr. Hima's twin sister (2018–2023)
 Amulya Omkar Gowda as Adult Sourya Karthik (2022)
Archana Ananth as Soundarya Anandarao: Anandrao's wife; Swapna, Karthik and Aditya's mother; Sourya, Jr. Hima, Nirupam, Prem and Deepu's grandmother. (2017–2023) 
 Gadiraju Arun Kumar as Anandarao: Soundarya's husband; Swapna, Karthik and Aditya's father; Sourya, Jr. Hima, Nirupam, Prem and Deepu's grandfather. (2017–2023)
 Manas Nagulapalli as Dr. Nirupam Satyam: Swapna and Satyam's elder son; Prem's brother; Sourya, Jr. Hima and Deepu's cousin; Jr. Hima's love interest. (2022)
 Tanav as Child Nirupam Satyam (2021-2022)
 Manoj Kumar as Prem Satyam: Swapna and Satyam's younger son; Nirupam's brother; Sourya, Jr. Hima and Deepu's cousin. (2022)
 Sathwik as Child Prem Satyam (2021-2022)

Recurring
Sowjanya Gandi as Dr. Charuseela: Mounitha's best friend; Deepa's rival; Karthik's colleague and friend in hospital in Sangharati.(2022-2023)
 Bhavani Chowdary as Shoba Devi: Nirupam's friend and one-sided lover; Swapna's friend's daughter (2022)
 Sri Rithika  / Sushma Kiron as Swapna Anandrao Satyam: Soundarya and Anandrao's daughter; Karthik and Aditya's sister; Satyam's wife; Nirupam and Prem's mother (2017–2018; 2021) / (2022)
 Chinni Krishna as Satyam: Swapna's husband; Nirupam and Prem's father (2022)
 Vaibhav Surya as Indrudu: Sourya's adoptive father; Chandramma's husband (2022–2023)
 Rajitha / Jahnavi as Chandramma: Sourya's adoptive mother; Indrudu's wife (2022–2023)
 Yashwant as Aditya Anandrao: Soundarya and Anandrao's younger son; Swapna and Karthik's brother; Shravya's husband; Deepu's father (2017-2022)
 Sangeetha Kamath / Niharika as Shravya Muralikrishna Aditya: Muralikrishna and Bhagyam's daughter; Deepa's half-sister; Aditya's wife; Karthik's former one-sided lover; Deepu's mother (2017–2020) / (2020–2022)
 Unknown as Anand aka Rava Idli: Monitha's surrogate son (2022–2023)
 Srinivas as Varanasi: Deepa's namesake brother in chawl (2018–present)
 Shiva Parvathi as Rajalakshmi: Village head in Sangharati; Dr.Hemachandra's aunt(2022–2023) 
Sasidhar as Dr.Hemachandra: Deepa's doctor and namesake brother. (2022-2023)
Unknown as Shiva: Mounitha's driver and assistant (2022–2023)
Tenali Shakuntala as Dr. Hemachandra's mother (2022–2023)
Narasimha Reddy as Durga: Contract killer; Deepa's namesake brother; Monitha's one-sided lover (2018; 2021; 2022) 
 Jyothi Reddy as ACP Roshini IPS : Police officer who investigated Deepa's missing case and Mounitha's murder case (2018; 2021;2022)
 Uma Devi as Bhagyalakshmi "Bhagyam" Muralikrishna: Muralikrishna's second wife; Shravya's mother; Deepa's step-mother; Deepu's grandmother; Sourya and Jr. Hima's step-grandmother (2017-2022;2023)
 Sri Divya as Priyamani: Monitha's maid and helper (2020-2021)
 Bhavana Reddy as Rudrani: A money-lender who clashed with Deepa in Thatikonda (2021)
 Ashok Rao as Muralikrishna: Bhagyam's husband; Deepa and Shravya's father; Sourya, Jr. Hima and Deepu's grandfather (2017-2022)
 Venugopal as Vihari: Tulasi's husband; Deepa's friend and mentor (2018;2021)
 Seetha Mahalakshmi as Tulasi Vihari: Vihari's wife; Deepa and Saundarya's acquaintance; The nurse who helped Deepa deliver Sourya and Hima (2018-2021)
 Lahari Vishnuwazhala as Hima: Karthik's college love interest (Dead)
 Bhavani Chowdary as Shoba Devi: Nirupam's friend and one-sided lover; Swapna's friend's daughter (2022–present)
 Yashvi Kanakala as Srilatha: Monitha's friend and helper (2018)
 Ayesha as Malathi: Saundarya's domestic help (2017-2021)
 Bharadwaj as Anji: Saundarya's driver; former contract killer who killed Sr Hima under Monitha's orders (2021)
 Dhana Lakshmi as Saroja: Deepa's namesake sister in chawl (2018-2022)
 Lucky Sree as Dr Bharathi: Karthik and Monitha's friend (2021-2022)
 Bhagya Sree as Constable Ratna Sita: Monitha's compulsive helper; Saundarya's helper (2021)
 Vijaya as Sr Hima's mother (2020-2021)
 Sirisha Sougandh as Judge for Karthik and Deepa's divorce trials (2019)
 Radha Prashanthi as Minister's wife (2017)
 Bhargavi as Deepa's teacher (2017)

Production
In late March 2020, the series' production and broadcast halted (along with that of all other Indian television series and films) due to the COVID-19 pandemic. It resumed in June of that year.

Adaptations

Reception

Viewership 
After a few months, the series became one of the top-rated Indian and Telugu television programs. Its highest rating had been 20.7 TVR. In the first week of June 2021, Karthika Deepam set a ratings record of 21.1 TVR.

In January 2019, the series had an average rating of about12 TVR. In October 2020, it remained a top-rated series. During week 34, it maintained a top position with 18.35 TVR. In week 42, it had an 18.56 TVR.

Ratings

Reception 
According to The Hindu, "The serial follows a faithful template set by Ekta Kapoor, that trendsetter who gave (mostly) housewives soapy and weepy sagas which belied both sense and sensibility at every tantalizing turn." An Asianet News reviewer wrote, "The serial, which takes place between trust and distrust, continues to take a turn for the worse."

References

External links

2017 Indian television series debuts
Indian drama television series
Indian television series
Indian television soap operas
Serial drama television series
Star Maa original programming
Telugu-language television shows